Ficklin may refer to:

Ficklin, Illinois, an unincorporated community in Douglas County, Illinois, United States
Ben Ficklin, Texas, county seat of Tom Green County from 1875 to 1882
Ficklin-Crawford Cottage, historic house located at Charlottesville, Virginia

People
Benjamin Franklin Ficklin (1827–1871), graduate of the Virginia Military Institute, Class of 1849
Orlando B. Ficklin (1808–1886), U.S. Representative from Illinois
Horatio Pettus Mackintosh Berney-Ficklin (1892–1961), a senior British Army officer